Archibald M. Carmichael (4 January 1882 – 30 August 1959) was a Canadian farmer, minister, teacher and politician. Carmichael was a Progressive party member of the House of Commons of Canada. He was born in Smithdale, Ontario.

Carmichael attended Collingwood Collegiate Institute, the Bradford Model School and Regina Normal School. He was a schoolteacher for seven years, having received his teachers' certificate in Saskatchewan. From 1910 to 1922 he was secretary-treasurer for the rural municipality of Kindersley (#290) and chaired the area's school board for four years. He also served as secretary-treasurer of several rural phone companies.

He was first elected to Parliament at the Kindersley riding in the 1921 general election then re-elected there in 1925, 1926 and 1930. After completing his fourth term, the 17th Canadian Parliament, Carmichael left federal politics and did not seek re-election in the 1935 vote.

References

External links
 

1882 births
1959 deaths
Canadian farmers
Canadian schoolteachers
Members of the House of Commons of Canada from Saskatchewan
Progressive Party of Canada MPs
People from Clearview, Ontario